Pachai Vilakku is a 2020 Indian Tamil-language film directed by Maran. The film stars Maran and Dheesha, Ammani & Sooraiyadal Flims fame Mahesh,Tara in the lead roles with Madras film fame Nandhakumar,Manobala, Imman Annachi,Nellai Siva,Vijay Tv fame Nanchil Vijayan with Siva Shankar Master  in supporting roles.  Kannada actress Roopika makes her Tamil debut with this film.

Cast 
 Maran as Ashwin Kumar
 Dheesha as Subhasini
 Imman Annachi as Vijay, sub inspector of police
 Tara as Vaishnavi
 Roopika as a ghost
 Sri Mahesh as Rajasekar alias Robert
 Manobala as Professor
 Poster Nandakumar as Periyavar
 K. Sivasankar as Professor
 Nellai Siva as Police inspector

Production 
The film was shot in Chennai, National Highway 45, Thiruporur, and Tiruvanamalai.

Soundtrack 
Devendran composed four songs for the film.

Release 
Deccan Chronicle wrote that "As a director, he [Maran] has extracted the best, be it from Dheesha, Tara and other newcomers. Imman Annachi performs well. But as an actor, Maran needs to hone his skills. The screenplay gets a bit preachy at times; nevertheless, the intention to impart a good message is obvious".

References

External links 

2020 drama films
2020 films
2020s Tamil-language films
Films scored by Devendran
Indian drama films